Harry Sylvester "Hal" Marnie (July 6, 1918 – January 7, 2002) was an American professional baseball player. Born in Philadelphia, he was a second baseman and shortstop who appeared in 96 games in Major League Baseball over parts of three seasons (1940–1942) for the Philadelphia Phillies.

Marnie's career lasted from 1937 through 1946, with three seasons (1943–1945) missed due to United States Army service in World War II. He batted .221 in 222 major-league at bats; his 49 hits included three doubles and three triples.

References

External links

1918 births
2002 deaths
Baseball players from Philadelphia
Centreville Colts players
Columbus Red Birds players
Crisfield Crabbers players
Hollywood Stars players
Houston Buffaloes players
Major League Baseball infielders
Moultrie Packers players
Ottawa-Ogdensburg Senators players
Philadelphia Phillies players
South Philadelphia High School alumni
Springfield Nationals players
Trenton Packers players
United States Army personnel of World War II